The Tren Urbano (English: Urban Train) is a  fully-automated rapid transit system that serves the municipalities of San Juan, Guaynabo, and Bayamón, in Puerto Rico.

The Tren Urbano complements other forms of public transportation services in the San Juan metropolitan area such as the Metropolitan Bus Authority, the Cataño Ferry, taxis, and shuttles. The entire mass transportation system is operated by the Integrated Transit Authority (ATI), The Tren Urbano system is operated by Alternate Concepts, Inc. (ACI). Tren Urbano is also the Caribbean's first rapid transit system.

History 

In the late 19th century, while the island was under Spanish rule, regional rail systems were begun in Puerto Rico. The railroad continued to be in use under American rule for most of the first half of the 20th century and played a key role in the transportation of people and goods throughout the island. The railroad systems of the period also played a vital role in the sugarcane industry.

During its heyday, it was the most modern electric streetcar system in Puerto Rico, rivaled New York and Toronto, and transported nearly 10 million passengers a year.

During the 1950s, an industrial boom, partly from development programs such as Operation Bootstrap, led to the downfall of agriculture as the principal industry on the island. Automobiles became more widely available, and more efficient roads and highways and the closure of sugarcane mills displaced the need for rail transportation. Soon, it was realized that an alternative means of mass transportation was needed to complement the public bus system to alleviate the severe traffic situation that was being created, especially in the San Juan metropolitan area.

Return of rail transit

Proposals

In 1967, proposals were made for the construction of a rapid rail transit system to serve the city of San Juan. In 1971, the major T.U.S.C.A. study, funded jointly by the Puerto Rico Planning Board and the US federal government, recommended an islandwide elevated transit system and new community development program. That proposal would have crossed and served the San Juan Metro Area by connecting it with the rest of the island without the necessity of highway construction. However, it was not until 1989 that the Puerto Rico Department of Transportation and Public Works (Departamento de Transportación y Obras Públicas, or DTOP in Spanish) officially adopted a proposal to begin design and construction of a rail system for the San Juan metropolitan area. The ridership demand for such a system had to be forecast by using a mathematical model prepared by a team of transportation planners and engineers. By 1992, various alignments of the proposed system were considered, but the final design chosen served only certain parts of the metro area and not Old San Juan. The name "Tren Urbano" (Urban Train) was chosen for the system. In 1993, the Federal Transit Administration (FTA) selected it as a Turnkey Demonstration Projects under the Intermodal Surface Transportation Efficiency Act of 1991. In 1996 and 1997, seven design-build contracts were awarded for different segments of the Tren Urbano Phase 1 system.

A number of companies shared the tasks for building the Tren Urbano including Siemens AG, which was granted a concession to design and build the line and its rolling stock and to operate it for the first five years. The company won a contract, which was a "first" for North America in the scope of the work that it involved; it was awarded in July 1996.

Construction

The construction project was plagued by delays, contractual disputes between the government and companies involved in the undertaking, and investigations into possible mismanagement of funds. The project cost was US$2.28 billion.

Free service
Free service was then offered on weekends until April 2005, when weekdays were added to the free service. Popularity grew quickly, and by the end of the free period,  40,000 people were using the train on a daily basis. By late 2005, however, ridership had fallen to 24,000, less than one third of the 80,000 projection and well below the projection of 110,000 for 2010.

Paid service
In 2006, average weekday boardings stood at 28,179 and in 2007, ridership decreased to 27,567. By the third quarter of 2008, average weekday ridership had increased to 36,500.

Issues and concerns
The Tren Urbano has no service to Old San Juan, Santurce, the Luis Muñoz Marín International Airport or to many other parts of Guaynabo, Bayamón, and San Juan, and it does not serve important suburbs like Cataño, Toa Baja, Toa Alta, Carolina, Trujillo Alto, Canóvanas and others, which helps to explain low ridership. Some question the viability of the system for additional reasons, such as the lack of an island-wide public-transportation system, such as the T.U.S.C.A. system proposed in 1971. The inner-city public bus transportation system, the Metropolitan Bus Authority (AMA), which operates in the Greater San Juan Metro Area, is considered unreliable by most people, and it does not have a regular schedule. Integration with public mass transit systems, such as the AMA and the AcuaExpreso (an urban ferry), was initially poor and remains a challenge for the DTOP.

COVID-19 crisis
During the COVID-19 pandemic in Puerto Rico, services on the Tren Urbano were halted by executive order to try to stop the spread of the virus.

Route 

Tren Urbano is made up of a single rapid transit route. It consists of 16 stations, ten of which are elevated, four at grade or in open cuttings, and two underground. It goes mostly through suburban areas. All stations are designed to handle three permanently-coupled pairs (6 cars). The stations in the system are:

 Sagrado Corazón (Sagrado Corazón)
 Hato Rey (Golden Mile / José Miguel Agrelot Coliseum)
 Roosevelt (Roosevelt Ave. and Ponce de León Ave.)
 Domenech (Hato Rey)
 Piñero (Hato Rey)
 Universidad (University of Puerto Rico at Río Piedras)
 Río Piedras (Río Piedras)
 Cupey
 Centro Médico (Puerto Rico Medical Services Administration and University of Puerto Rico, Medical Sciences Campus)
 San Francisco (535 parking spaces)
 Las Lomas
 Martínez Nadal (1,200 parking spaces)
 Torrimar (Guaynabo) (45 parking spaces)
 Jardines (128 parking spaces)
 Deportivo (Juan Ramón Loubriel Stadium and Coliseo Rubén Rodríguez)
 Bayamón (Bayamón) (400 parking spaces)

Each station boasts unique a artwork and architectural style.

A maintenance depot and operations control center are halfway along the route, between Martínez Nadal and Torrimar stations.

Fares 

A single trip costs $1.50 ($0.75 if customers transfer from an AMA bus), including a 1-hour bus transfer period. If a customer exits the station and wants to get back on the train, the full fare must be re-paid; there is no train-to-train transfer period. Students and seniors (aged 60–74 ) pay 75 cents per trip. Senior citizens older than 75 and children under 6 ride for free. Several unlimited-ride passes are also available.

A stored-value multi-use farecard may be used for travel on buses and trains. The value on the card is automatically deducted each time that it is used. The system is similar to the MetroCard system used in New York City.

Rolling stock 

Each vehicle carries 72 seated and 108 standing passengers. All cars operate as married pairs, and up to three pairs run together at any given time. Tren Urbano operates 15 trains during rush hours, and the remaining cars stand at the yards or serve as spares if a train experiences problems. The rolling stock was assembled at the Siemens plant in Sacramento, California.

Power is provided by AC traction motors, which were chosen over DC by containing fewer moving parts and requiring less maintenance. The trains share many characteristics with the stock built by Siemens for Boston MBTA's Blue Line route (700 series). The system is electrified by third rail at 750 V DC.

Air-conditioning systems have been specially designed to cope with the hot and muggy conditions that are commonly experienced in the metropolitan area.

A yellow powered flat car is visible at the maintenance facility. Some metro cars have been used to transport material when they are not in service.

Tren Urbano facilities
Rolling stock for Tren Urbano metro cars are stored at the Hogar del Niño Operations and Maintenance Building, near the exit to PR-21 from PR-20 and a short distance from Martínez Nadal station.

The metro cars are stored on outdoor tracks. Also, there is a large maintenance building for servicing the fleet.

Both Bayamón and Sagrado Corazon terminal stations have dead-end tracks at the end of their respective station that can store two train sets.

Bus terminals 

The bus system in the San Juan metropolitan area has been designed around the Tren Urbano. Five train stations also serve as bus terminals: Sagrado Corazón, Piñero, Cupey, Martínez Nadal, and Bayamón.

Expansion plans 

The infrastructure of the Tren Urbano, with stations built for six–car train sets and a minimum headway of 90 seconds, has a maximum capacity of 40,000 passengers per hour per direction, compared to 3,000 passengers per hour per direction for the current peak hour 8 minute headway and 4-car trains and to an actual daily ridership of roughly 40,000 commuters. The train system is thus working at 13.33% capacity, also well under the 110,000 rail passengers planned by 2010.

In addition, with a fleet of 74 rail vehicles in the local yard to cover at least double the 10.7 miles (17.2 km) system length and with all of the basic facilities and capital equipment needed for the functioning in place, it is indispensable for the train to be extended, as it was originally intended to include higher-density areas of the central district for it to be operationally successful and sustainable.

The Puerto Rico's Department of Transportation and Public Works (DTPW) plans include:

Phase 1A 
 Phase 1A of the project includes the extension of the original line westward from the current terminal at Sagrado Corazón (Sacred Heart) through a medium to high density corridor in two stations: San Mateo to a new terminal at Minillas at the heart of Santurce, a distance of 1,500 meters, with a possible transfer from Minillas to a future tram line from the historic district of Old San Juan to the Luis Muñoz Marín International Airport. Phase 1A was approved by the United States Environmental Protection Agency. 
 By the end of fiscal 2008, the legislature identified federal funds for the expansion of the train in its second phase. It was expected that during fiscal year 2009, the legislature would begin to issue bonds for that purpose. , there are no plans to expand the Tren Urbano.

Phase 2 
 Upon opening of the Tren Urbano, there were further proposals to extend the rail system to other municipalities such as Carolina. A two-way tunnel, 136 ft (42 meters) long, south of the Río Piedras Station is already built for a future expansion along the heavily-transited 65th Infantry Avenue.
 In 2012, the government informed that it had no plans to expand the Tren Urbano in the future and that it was moving to other alternatives to help alleviate traffic.

Other projects 
There are several projects to improve public transport connectivity:

 Also being considered (2008) is a tramway from Sagrado Corazón station to colonial Old San Juan in Puerta de Tierra, where many of Puerto Rico's state government buildings are located. It would run partially on an existing right-of-way on Fernández Juncos Ave. The first line of the tramway would be built by the Municipality of San Juan (MSJ) and will be known as the Sistema de Asistencia, Transportación y Organización Urbana (System of Assistance, Transportation and Urban Organization) (SATOUR).
 There is a proposal to build a second tram line to Carolina, possibly with a station at the Luis Muñoz Marín International Airport.
 The extension of a line to Caguas by the existing Urban Train from the Centro Médico or Cupey stations is considered.
 A second plan for the development of a line to Caguas with a new "Light regional railcar" network system would have future extensions throughout the island.

Network map

See also 

 List of Latin American rail transit systems by ridership
 List of metro systems worldwide
 List of Puerto Rico railroads
 List of United States rapid transit systems by ridership
 Metro systems by annual passenger rides
 Rail transport in Puerto Rico
 Transportation in Puerto Rico
 T.U.S.C.A.

References

External links 

 Tren Urbano App (unofficial app)
 Urge darle vida al Tren Urbano – Editorial de El Nuevo Día 
 Urban Transport Technology – San Juan Tren Urbano Heavy Rail System, Puerto Rico
 Puerto Rico Public Art Project – Tren Urbano – Photos and information related to the artwork located on each of the train route's stations.
 En Rieles – Campaign to promote San Juan Tram 
 Unofficial Tren Urbano site in english, spanish, french, german and italian

 
Passenger rail transport in Puerto Rico
Rapid transit in Puerto Rico
750 V DC railway electrification
Railway lines opened in 2004
2004 establishments in Puerto Rico